Bannerman's weaver (Ploceus bannermani) is a species of bird in the weaver family, Ploceidae.  It is found in Cameroon and Nigeria.  Its natural habitat is subtropical or tropical moist montane forests.  It is threatened by habitat loss.

Its scientific and common names honor the ornithologist David Armitage Bannerman.

References

External links
 Bannerman's weaver -  Species text in Weaver Watch.

Bannerman's weaver
Birds of Central Africa
Bannerman's weaver
Bannerman's weaver
Taxonomy articles created by Polbot
Fauna of the Cameroonian Highlands forests